Club Deportivo Atlético Tecomán is a Mexican football club that plays in the Tercera División de México. The club is based in Tecomán, Colima and was founded in 1978 under the name Estudiantes de Tecomán and was owned by IAETAC, a private university in the city. With this name the team got its first title in 1983 when it won the Tercera División. 

During the 1980s and 1990s it was the most important team in the state of Colima due to its continued presence in the Mexican Second Division. In 1994 the team was not considered to enter the Primera División 'A', so it lost relevance and began to play mostly in the Third Division. In 2004 the team won its second championship in this division, however the team gave its place to Soccer Manzanillo.

In 2015 the team registered in the Liga de Nuevos Talentos, participating only that season.

For 2019–20 Liga TDP season, the team license was rented to Rojos de Colima, also, the sale of the franchise and club facilities was announced. In 2020 the team returned.

See also
Football in Mexico
Tercera División de México

External links
Liga TDP
Liga BBVA MX Official Profile

References 

Football clubs in Colima
Association football clubs established in 2015
2015 establishments in Mexico